"Violeta" is a song recorded by South Korean–Japanese girl group Iz*One, released on April 1, 2019 by Off the Record Entertainment as the lead single from their second extended play (EP) Heart*Iz.

Composition
"Violeta" is a pop track with tropical house beats and a future bass intro, inspired by the story "The Happy Prince" lyrically. It is described by Jeff Benjamin of Billboard as having "a color and floral theme as the ladies try to conjure and coax a lover into opening up to them like a flower on the verge of blooming". It offers a more uptempo and choreography-focused than the previous Korean song "La Vie en Rose". Jack Wannan of LWOS Life praised the song as "[an] amazing production".

Commercial performance
In South Korea the song peaked at number 18. On the K-Pop Hot 100 the song peaked at number five making it the group's highest charting song on the chart. On the US World chart the song peaked at number 8 becoming their second top 10 hit. Despite being a Korean single the song was successful in Japan too peaking at number 13 on the Billboard Japan Hot 100.

Music video
The music video for "Violeta" was released on April 1, 2019. Directed by Digipedi, the video gives a "vibrant and nature-themed imagery [...] featuring meadow flowers, glowing prisms, splashing water and more aesthetically pleasing designs".

As at March 22 2021, the music video achieves more than 70 million views. Off the Record released a special video in commemoration of achieving 40 million views.

Personnel
Credits adapted from the liner notes of Heart*Iz.

 Iz*One – primary vocals
 Choi Hyun-joon – composer, lyrics, vocal direction
 Kim Seung-soo – composer, lyrics
 Park Seul-gi – arrangement, computer programming, instrument
 Kim So-ri – chorus

 Kim Min-hee – recording engineer
 Choi Hyun-jun – vocal editing
 Mr. Cho – mixing engineer
 Kwon Nam-woo – mastering engineer

Charts

Accolades

Music program wins

See also 
 List of M Countdown Chart winners (2019)

References

Iz*One songs
2019 singles
2019 songs
Korean-language songs